Acraea sykesi, the Sykes' acraea, is a butterfly in the family Nymphalidae. It is found in northern Nigeria, northern Cameroon, the Central African Republic, the north-eastern part of the Democratic Republic of the Congo, south-eastern Sudan, northern Uganda, north-western Kenya and possibly north-western Tanzania.

Description
Very similar to Acraea doubledayi qv.

Biology
The habitat consists of dry riverbeds and savanna.

The larvae feed on Adenia species, including A. venenata.

Taxonomy
It is a member of the Acraea caecilia species group. See also Pierre & Bernaud, 2014.

References

External links

Images representing Acraea sykesi at Bold.

Butterflies described in 1902
sykesi